The 2001 President's Cup was a men's tennis tournament played on outdoor hard courts in Tashkent in Uzbekistan and was part of the International Series of the 2001 ATP Tour. The tournament ran from 10 September through 16 September 2001. First-seeded Marat Safin won the singles title.

Finals

Singles

 Marat Safin defeated  Yevgeny Kafelnikov, 6–2, 6–2.
 It was Safin's 2nd title of the year and the 10th of his career.

Doubles

 Julien Boutter /  Dominik Hrbatý defeated  Marius Barnard /  Jim Thomas, 6–4, 3–6, [13–11].
 It was Boutter's 2nd title of the year and the 4th of his career. It was Hrbatý's 2nd title of the year and the 5th of his career.

See also
 2001 Tashkent Open

References

President's Cup
ATP Tashkent Open
President's Cup
President's Cup